The Museum of History in Granite is a museum in the town of Felicity, California. The museum exhibits monuments made from Missouri Red Granite. Conceived as an historic record of humanity designed to last for four millennia, the Museum of History in Granite is a collection of over 900 large granite outdoor panels. The museum was conceived and commissioned by Jacques-André Istel and its lead artist is Gene Britton.

Development has been underway for several decades with most of monuments completed. However the eight monuments of the "History of Humanity" are only 31% engraved.

Subjects include the History of California, Dedicated in 2016. Smaller monuments include the Felicity Stone, a "Rosetta Stone for the future" located at the center of the History of Humanity monuments.

Exhibits 
Felicity Stone (9 panels) - using a concept similar to the Rosetta Stone translation from English to several ancient languages
 History of Humanity (416 panels - 25% complete) - Centerpiece exhibit includes Michaelangelo's Creation on panels #11-13.
USMC Korean War Memorial - List of the 4,617 Marines and 107 Navy Corpsmen who gave their lives during the Korean War.
 Quest for the Sky - History of aviation (Recipient of the Air and Space Medal in Europe in 2003), 
 The History of the French Foreign Legion (51 panels) 
 The History of Arizona
 Hall of Fame of Parachuting
 The Wall for the Ages - record your name here for the ages
 The History of the United States of America (62 panels) - Dedication was on Washington's Birthday 2014.
 The History of California

References

External links 
 HistoryInGranite.org - Official Website

Aerospace museums in California
Churches in California
Halls of fame in California
Landmarks in California
Museums in Imperial County, California
History museums in California